The Shark is an American FM radio classic hits-formatted duopoly serving the Seacoast Region of New Hampshire, York County, Maine, and northeast Massachusetts.  Its two stations are WSAK (102.1 MHz; Hampton) and WSHK (105.3 MHz; Kittery, Maine), with broadcast studios located in Dover. The station's program format is almost exclusively classic hits.  A few specialty programs are carried: The House of Blues Radio Hour with Dan "Elwood Blues" Aykroyd, and "The Reporter's File", a public affairs program, both on Sundays.  The station was previously the only New Hampshire station to carry the syndicated Bob & Tom Show morning show.  It no longer carries that program, instead using its own local DJs on The Shark Morning Show.

The station is owned by Townsquare Media. It formerly broadcast as "Arrow", on the same frequencies and with a similar format, but using call letters WXBB and WXBP. The change to the new name and call was made in March 2000.  Citadel Broadcasting acquired the station in August 1999 when it purchased Fuller-Jeffrey Broadcasting Companies. Citadel merged with Cumulus Media on September 16, 2011.

On August 30, 2013, a deal was announced in which Townsquare Media would acquire 53 Cumulus stations, including WSAK/WSHK, for $238 million. The deal was part of Cumulus' acquisition of Dial Global; Townsquare and Dial Global are both controlled by Oaktree Capital Management. The sale to Townsquare was completed on November 14, 2013.

References

External links
Shark 102.1 & 105.3 official website

SAK
Townsquare Media radio stations
Classic hits radio stations in the United States
Rockingham County, New Hampshire
Radio stations established in 1992
1992 establishments in New Hampshire